Leslie Alan Wilson (born 1941/42), an Australian billionaire, is the executive chairman of Reece Group, Australia's biggest bathroom and plumbing supplies chain.

Wilson was educated at Camberwell Grammar School, Melbourne, matriculating in 1959.

Wilson was CEO of Reece from 1970 to 2007, and has been executive chairman since 2001. His son Peter is the CEO.

Net worth
, The Australian Financial Review assessed the net worth of the Wilson family as 7.86 billion on the Financial Review 2021 Rich List. The Wilson family had earlier appeared in the BRW Rich Families List that  was published annually between 2008 and 2015. Meanwhile, Forbes Asia assessed Wilson's net worth as 1.6 billion in 2017; revised to 2.50 billion in 2019.

References

1940s births
Living people
Australian billionaires
Australian businesspeople
People educated at Camberwell Grammar School
People from Melbourne